Kawcze is a PKP railway station in Kawcze (Pomeranian Voivodeship), Poland.

Lines crossing the station

Train services

The station is served by the following services:
Regional services (R) Słupsk — Miastko
Regional services (R) Słupsk — Miastko — Szczecinek
Regional services (R) Słupsk — Miastko — Szczecinek — Chojnice

References 

Kawcze article at Polish Stations Database, URL accessed at 7 March 2006

Railway stations in Pomeranian Voivodeship
Bytów County